Plane Dippy is a 1936 Warner Bros. Looney Tunes cartoon directed by Tex Avery. The short was released on April 30, 1936, and stars Porky Pig.

In this cartoon, Porky has joined the United States Army Air Corps. Beans makes a cameo drawing a line on the floor during the "Spinning Test" sequence. Porky is tasked with operating a voice-activated robot aircraft, but the robot instead listen to orders given by random children.

This is also the first cartoon in the "Porky Pig" series.

Plot
Porky is looking to join the military. He briefly considers the Army's infantry division and the Navy, before deciding to join the Air Corps. When the recruiter asks Porky for his name, he responds, "Porky Cornelius Washington Otis Lincoln Abner Aloysius Casper Jefferson Philbert Horatius Narcissus Pig," a full name unused before or since. He writes "P-P-P-P-P-P-P-P-P-P-P-P-P" on the chalkboard that was given to him by the recruiter, which he then drops it on the floor.

Porky applies to one of the jobs. The sergeant (similar to MGM's Spike) sends Porky through a series of tests, which he fails disastrously. Because of his inadequate performance, while the other soldiers are being issued rifles, Porky is issued a feather duster and ordered to clean a voice-activated robot plane. Meanwhile, Little Kitty is playing with a puppy, and the plane's control unit picks up her voice. The plane takes Porky on an incredibly wild ride.

The plane destroys a military balloon (the crew parachute to safety). It levels a building except for the clock tower. It crashes through a circus tent, causing trapeze performers to do tricks on his plane. It goes through the ocean, chasing a fish and getting chased in turn by a whale. It even crashes into a wagon load of hay, turning the cargo into straw hats. It nearly destroys several other planes, but they nimbly escape. Finally, a number of other children show up and shout constant commands at the puppy, causing the plane to go totally berserk. Finally, the exhausted puppy's owner tells him to come home, and the plane does so, crashing into the hangar. Porky goes racing from the building and dashes into the office of the infantry division, proclaiming that he wants to "l-l-learn to m-m-march". The cartoon ends with Porky carrying a rifle and marching in formation with a number of other soldiers.

References

External links

Plane Dippy at the Big Cartoon Database

1936 films
1936 animated films
1936 short films
1930s science fiction films
American aviation films
American black-and-white films
Animated films about aviation
Films scored by Bernard B. Brown
Films scored by Norman Spencer (composer)
Films about the United States Army Air Forces
Films directed by Tex Avery
Beans the Cat films
Porky Pig films
Looney Tunes shorts
Warner Bros. Cartoons animated short films
Films about pigs
Animated films about cats
Animated films about dogs
1930s Warner Bros. animated short films
Animated films about robots
American robot films